Jasmin  (formerly, Jasmine) is an  unincorporated community in Kern County, California.

The Jasmine post office operated from 1913 to 1923.

References

Unincorporated communities in Kern County, California
Unincorporated communities in California